East Anglian English is a dialect of English spoken in East Anglia, primarily in or before the mid-20th century. East Anglian English has had a very considerable input into modern Estuary English. However, it has received little attention from the media and is not easily recognised by people from other parts of the United Kingdom. East Anglia is not easily defined and its boundaries are not uniformly agreed upon.

The Fens were traditionally an uninhabited area that was difficult to cross, so there was little dialect contact between the two sides of the Fens.

Sub-dialects that linguist Peter Trudgill specifies include Norfolk (Broad Norfolk), Suffolk, Essex, Cambridgeshire, and various Fenland dialects.

History 
In Jacek Fisiak's and Peter Trudgill's book, East Anglian English, they describe the important influence East Anglian English has had on the development of the English language. In addition to its influence in the Standard English that is known today all around England, there is evidence according to Oxford Dictionary that East Anglian English grammar was heard in North Carolina.

S. L. Bensusan set out to record elements of the East Anglian dialect and records a statement made by a local when she caught him making notes on the sleeve of his shirt: "Whatever you bin makin' them little owd squiggles on y'r cuff fower?" Bensusan replied that he was "writing history". He then recorded her retort: "You dedn't wanter done that. Telly f'r why. When you've got y'r shirt washed there won't be nawthen left. I've never wrote nawthen all me born days, ne yet me husban', an he got all his teeth an' I kin thread me needle without spectacles. Folk don't wanter write in this world, they wanter do a job o' work."

Grammar 

 Third-person singular zero is the lack of -s in third-person verb conjugations and is considered as the "best-known dialect feature" of East Anglian English. Examples include "she go" or "that say".
 Use of the word do with the meaning of or, or else , for example "You better go to bed now, do you’ll be tired in the morning"
 That is used in place of central pronoun it, e.g. "that's cloudy", "that's hot out there" and "that book, that's okay, I like it". The final example still uses it, but only when it is the object of a verb. The word that usually denotes it when it is the subject of the clause, so that "it is" becomes "that is" and "it smells funny" becomes "that smell funny". This does not imply emphatic usage as it would in Standard English and indeed sentences such as "When that rain, we get wet", are entirely feasible in the dialect. (Incidentally, it is almost never heard as the first word of a sentence in the speech of a true Norfolk dialect speaker, e.g. "It's a nice day today" is virtually always rendered by "Thass a nice day today".) 
 Time is used to mean while, for example, "You sit down, time I get dinner ready."
 Now can also mean just, i.e. "I am now leaving" also means "I am just leaving".
 Some verbs conjugate differently in Norfolk or Suffolk. The past tense of 'show', for example is 'shew', and of the verb to snow, 'snew', swam becomes 'swum'. The past of drive is 'driv'. e.g. 'I driv all the way to Yarmouth, and on the way back that snew.' 'Sang' is always 'sung' ('She sung out of tune'), and 'stank' is always 'stunk' ('After they had mucked out the pigs their clothes stunk'). Many verbs simply have no past tense, and use the present form. e.g. 'Come', 'say' and 'give'. 'When my husband come home, he say he give tuppence for a loaf of bread' meaning 'When he came home, he said, he gave tuppence...'. This even applies to a verb like 'go'. 'Every time they go to get the needle out, it moved'. Verbs whose past participles differ from their active past tenses e.g. 'spoken', are mostly ignored in Norfolk. e.g. 'If you were clever you were spoke to more often by the teacher', or 'If I hadn't went up to Mousehold that night'.
 The present participle, or ...ing, form of the verb, such as running, writing etc. is mostly rendered in the Middle English form of 'a-running', 'a-jumping' etc. 'She's a-robbing me'.

Vocabulary 
  – in bed
 bishybarnybee – a ladybird
 bor – neighbor (or friend) in Norfolk
 cor blarst me – "god blast me", when expressing, shock, surprise or exasperation
 craze – nag. e.g. he kept crazing me to buy him sweets, or I'd craze her and craze her)
 dag – dew
 dene – the sandy area by the coast
 dew yew keep a throshin – means "carry on with the threshing" on its own in Norfolk but also means goodbye or "take care of yourself"
 dickey – donkey; however note that the word 'donkey' appears only to have been in use in English since the late 18th century. The Oxford English Dictionary quotes 'dicky' as one of the alternative slang terms for an ass.)
 directly – "as soon as" or "immediately"), as in "Directly they got their money on Friday nights, the women would get the suits out of the pawn shop"
 dodman – a term used to refer to a snail
 dow – a pigeon
 dwile – floorcloth
 dudder – shiver or tremble (not necessarily unique to Norfolk, it appears in the OED as dodder)
 finish, at the/in the – eventually, as in "he gave it to her at the finish"; or "You might as well have went in the beginning, 'cause you had to go in the finish".)
 get on to someone – to tell someone off, as in "They all went quiet, but they never got onto father no more")
 gays – the pictures printed on a book or a newspaper
 grup – refers to a small trench
 guzunder – chamber pot (derived from "goes-under")
 hutkin – used for a finger protecter
 mawkin – a scarecrow
 mawther – local word referring to a girl or young woman
 on the huh, on the moo - askew
 pit – a pond
 push – a boil or pimple
 quant – punt pole
 ranny – term meaning 'shrew'
 sowpig – a woodlouse
 staithe – an archaic term still used to reference any landing stage
 stroop – the throat

 Accent 

However, several features also differentiate East Anglian accents.
 Vowels 
Where the suffix '-ing' is preceded by a vowel or diphthong, there is a smoothing effect that results in a single vowel. This phenomenon is the only one in East Anglia that is spreading, in the 21st century, from north to south (the opposite direction from the typical south-to-north influences coming out of London).
 // is a very front vowel , unlike RP or London English where it is a back vowel.
  was once used in a particular subset of words (certain closed- and single-syllable words) within the  set, such as coat, don't, home, stone, and whole (the final item a homophone with hull). This was extremely old-fashioned even by the late 20th century.
 Single-syllable words with the vowel spelt 'oo' such as 'roof' and 'hoof' have the vowel  to give  and  respectively.
 The toe–tow merger typical of most Modern English dialects may continue to be resisted. An exception is that of words spelt with 'ou', 'ow', 'ol' such as 'soul', 'know', 'told' which have a wider diphthong quite similar to the RP , or even wider . However, the toe-tow merger is indeed well-established in Ipswich (Suffolk) and Colchester (Essex), in the 21st century expanding gradually into Norfolk.
 The pane–pain merger typical of most Modern English dialects may continue to be resisted. This has largely given way throughout most of East Anglia to a merger towards .
Thus 'beer' and 'bear' sound the same, the vowel quality being . This may be considered to be a related case to that of smoothing.
  as in first is pronounced  or : . Since the mid-20th century, this very open realisation has largely disappeared, at least in urban East Anglia.
  is traditionally , a narrower glide than RP, but since the second half of the 20th century, a backer realisation is favoured, .

 Consonants 
Yod-dropping occurs after all consonants. Additionally, in East Anglia, yod-dropping is found after any consonant, and this seems to be a unique regionalism. Therefore, RP  is pronounced as Norfolk  (where C stands for any consonant). For example, "beautiful", "few", "huge", "accuse" have pronunciations that sound like "bootiful", "foo", "hooge", "akooz".
 H-dropping is rarer than in most other parts of England. (However, H-dropping is indeed typical in urban Norwich.)
 "Clear L" is possible in all contexts in speakers born before 1920. In contexts where RP pronounces  as "dark L" , these older Norfolk speakers have "clear L" so that the sound in 'hill' and 'milk' sounds similar to the clear L heard at the beginning of words such as 'lip'.

 Prosody 
In addition to the above phonological features, East Anglian English also has a distinct rhythm. This is due to the loss of unstressed syllables associated with East Anglian speakers. There appears to be no agreed framework for describing the prosodic characteristics of different dialects (see Intonation). Writing in 1889, the phonetician Alexander John Ellis began his section on East Anglian speech with these comments:

There does appear to be agreement that the Norfolk accent has a distinctive rhythm due to some stressed vowels being longer than their equivalents in RP and some unstressed vowels being much shorter. Claims that Norfolk speech has intonation with a distinctive "lilt" lack robust empirical evidence.

Norwich accent
In addition to above features, one specific accent is associated with urban Norfolk and namely its largest city, Norwich.
This is a manifestation of the lot-cloth split.
However, the rounded RP variant is encroaching even in urban Norwich.
Norfolk smoothing (mentioned above) is particularly advanced.

Portrayal

The treatment of the Norfolk dialect in the television drama All the King's Men in 1999 in part prompted the foundation of the Friends of Norfolk Dialect (FOND), a group formed with the aim of preserving and promoting Broad Norfolk.

Arnold Wesker's 1958 play Roots used Norfolk dialect.

During the 1960s, Anglia Television produced a soap opera called "Weavers Green" which used local characters making extensive use of Norfolk dialect. The programme was filmed at the "cul-de-sac" village of Heydon north of Reepham in mid Norfolk.

An example of the Norfolk accent and vocabulary can be heard in the songs by Allan Smethurst, aka The Singing Postman. Smethurst's Norfolk accent is well known from his releases of the 1960s, such as "Hev Yew Gotta Loight Bor?". The Boy John Letters of Sidney Grapes, which were originally published in the Eastern Daily Press, are another valid example of the Norfolk dialect. Beyond simply portrayers of speech and idiom however, Smethurst, and more especially Grapes, record their authentic understanding of mid-20th century Norfolk village life. Grapes' characters, the Boy John, Aunt Agatha, Granfar, and Ole Missus W, perform a literary operetta celebrating down-to-earth ordinariness over bourgeois affectation and pretence.

Charles Dickens had some grasp of the Norfolk accent which he utilised in the speech of the Yarmouth fishermen, Ham and Daniel Peggoty in David Copperfield. Patricia Poussa analyses the speech of these characters in her article Dickens as Sociolinguist. She makes connections between Scandinavian languages and the particular variant of Norfolk dialect spoken in the Flegg area around Great Yarmouth, a place of known Viking settlement. Significantly, the use of 'that' meaning 'it', is used as an example of this apparent connection.

The publication in 2006 by Ethel George (with Carole and Michael Blackwell) of The Seventeenth Child provides a written record of spoken dialect, though in this case of a person brought up inside the city of Norwich. Ethel George was born in 1914, and in 2006 provided the Blackwells with extensive tape-recorded recollections of her childhood as the seventeenth offspring of a relatively poor Norwich family. Carole Blackwell has reproduced a highly literal written rendering of this.

An erudite and comprehensive study of the dialect, by Norfolk native and professor of sociolinguistics Peter Trudgill can be found in his book The Norfolk Dialect (2003), published as part of the 'Norfolk Origins' series by Poppyland Publishing, Cromer.

Notable speakers

 Horatio Nelson (1758–1805) – "I am a Norfolk man, and glory in being so"; also said to Captain Hardy "Do you anchor" (an order, not a question, in the Dialect)Martin Robson A History of the Royal Navy: Napoleonic Wars p34
 Bernard Matthews (1930–2010) – turkey tycoon
Writers and entertainers
 Maurice Wood (1916–2007) – Bishop of Norwich, recorded the gospel in Norfolk dialect
 Sidney Grapes (1887–1958) – author of The Boy John Letters''
 The Nimmo Twins – comedy duo
 Singing Postman – aka Allan Smethurst (1927–2000)
 Keith Skipper – former Norfolk broadcaster and dialect expert
 Peter Trudgill (b. 1943) – professor of sociolinguistics, author of several books on the Norfolk dialect and currently honorary professor of sociolinguistics at the University of East Anglia
 The Kipper Family – exponents of comedy folk, whose traditions are being kept barely alive by Sid Kipper
 Ted Snelling – Norfolk dialect expert and narrator of his audio book "Grandfather's Norwich"
Sam Larner (1878–1965) – fisherman and traditional singer
Harry Cox (1885–1971) – farmworker and traditional singer

See also
List of dialects of the English language

References

Bibliography

External links
Sounds Familiar?Listen to examples of regional accents and dialects from across the UK on the British Library's 'Sounds Familiar' website
East Anglian English, Oxford English Dictionary
East Anglian Dialect Poetry, by "Anon", 2006

British English
East Anglia